Allegoria is a 2022 American horror anthology film directed by Spider One, starring John Ennis, Bryce Johnson, Edward Hong, Adam Busch and Adam Marcinowski. It is the directorial debut of Spider One.

Plot

Cast
Kyrsy Fox as Brody
 John Ennis as Robert Anderson Wright
 Bryce Johnson as Marcus
 Edward Hong as Eddie Park
 Adam Busch as John
 Adam Marcinowski as The Whistler
 Scout Taylor-Compton

Release
The film premiered at Panic Fest in May 2022. The film became available to watch on Shudder and received a Video on demand release by RLJE Films.

Reception
Drew Tinnin of Dread Central rated the film 3.5 stars out of 5, calling it "a creepy collection of cautionary tales with a heavy metal edge that’s sure to get under your skin." 

Matt Donato of Paste rated the film 5 out of 10, calling it a "damning, dialogue-heavy, seedy but ultimately unfocused anthology that will speak loudest to creatively suffering audiences." The film received a rating of 2.5 out of 5 in Horror Society. Ian Sedensky of Culture Crypt gave the film a score of 30, writing, "the only entertaining moment in “Allegoria” comes from imagining Uncork’d and Wild Eye reps seeing the Shudder and RLJE Films company cards and asking, “Wait, this wasn’t released by one of us?”"

References

External links
 
 

2022 horror films
American horror anthology films
2022 directorial debut films